George Milpurrurru (1934–1998) was an Australian Aboriginal artist known for his bark paintings.

Biography 
Milpurrurru was born in 1934 and raised in central Arnhem Land, specifically Ganalbingu land, where he learned his artistry. He came from a family of artists; he was the son of Dick Ngulmarrmar, who taught him the art of bark painting, and the sister of Dorothy Djukulul, also a highly respected bark painter. He is a part of the Gurrumba Gurrumba clan, which means “a flock of geese”. The traditions, styles, and surroundings of his clan provided much inspiration when it came to his bark paintings. Milpurrurru's daughter, Gladys Getjpulu, is also an artist.

He died in 1998.

Style 

As one of the Ramingining artists, Milpurrurru was inspired by the narratives of his home, branching out from the style taught by his father. For him the space used is juxtaposed between stark forefront and background solid spaces, creating dimension with bare bark. 

He individualised his work by adding innovative styles to the traditional styles and techniques of his clan such as combining the cross-hatching technique of Arnhem Land with the Eastern technique of depicting plain figures against black backgrounds. His most common theme amongst his paintings is the magpie geese.

Career
He started his career as an artist by selling his work in the 1970s to art dealer Dorothy Bennett. 

He was one of the first Indigenous artists to exhibit at the Biennale of Sydney in 1979. 

Along with Johnny Bonguwuy and David Malangi, Milpurrurru took part in the 1979 Sydney event, A European Dialogue, in which their art was first broadcast to a wider audience, the larger part of metropolitan Australia.

In 1985, he showed his first solo exhibition at the Aboriginal Arts Australia Gallery in Sydney. Following his solo exhibition, he showed for a second time at the Biennale of Sydney. His work gained global recognition when he participated in several major international exhibitions, like Aratjara, touring Europe from 1993 to 1994.  Milpurrurru was also a senior contributing artist to the Aboriginal Memorial, and the first Aboriginal artist with a solo retrospective exhibition at the National Gallery of Australia in Canberra.

His work The Goose Egg Hunt (1983) is held by the National Gallery. In 1993 it was used by Australia Post on the 85c postage stamp, celebrate the  International Year for the World's Indigenous People.

Milpurrurru also played an integral role in the "carpets case", a 1994 successful lawsuit dealing with the application of copyright in Australia and Indigenous intellectual property to Indigenous Australian arts, along with Banduk Marika, Tim Payungka Tjapangarti and five others. Goose Egg Hunt had been used by a Perth company to be reproduced on rugs in Vietnam.

Aboriginal Memorial 

The Aboriginal Memorial is a memorial constructed by twenty men of Ramingining and is meant to serve as a reminder of the Aboriginal peoples' place within Australia in response to European colonisation. It is made up of 200 decorated hollow log coffins and was conceived by Djon (John) Mundine in 1987–88 and realised by 43 artists, one of whom was Milpurruruu. Milpurrurru's work, representing the Ganalbingu people in the upper right bank of the memorial, is intended to demonstrate distinction of place through the depiction of water lilies and cormorants.

Collections 
Milpurruruu's work is held in the permanent collections of the following:

 National Museum of Australia 
 National Gallery of Victoria
 Art Gallery of New South Wales

References 

1934 births
1998 deaths
Australian Aboriginal artists